Asseng Protais (1946 – 30 June 2006) was a Cameroonian playwright.

Life
Protais was born in Nanga-Eboko, a small town in Cameroon located along the Sanaga River. He wrote over 10 plays from 1969 through to 1983, with five selections from his works receiving international awards. One of his pieces, Enough is Enough, which he wrote in 1978 while he was studying engineering in Paris, was the winner of the 1978 Prix des Auditeurs du Concours Interafricain. The play is a satirical work in which Protais blended the contemporary French comedy of the time with African-style storytelling in order to promote the concept of family planning. The inaugural production of Enough is Enough was performed in his home country of Cameroon in 1979, and it was translated into English by Alex Gross, for the Ubu Repertory Theater in 1985. In 1994, whilst serving as a professor at Indiana University, Protais made a public claim in relation to the film Junior. He believed that writer Kevin Wade and director Chris Conrad used Enough is Enough as inspiration without crediting the Cameroonian writer (the film depicts Arnold Schwarzenegger as a scientist who undergoes a male pregnancy as part of a scientific experiment).

Another well-received play by Protais, Homme Femme, was written in 1983 and won the "Prix du concours Theatral" (a concours sponsored by Radio France International (RFI)). Later, in 1991, the play Bokassa Ier earned Protais the award, "Grand prix des rencontres litteraire de yaounde".

Death
Protais died on 30 June 2006 from paludism (also known as malaria or swamp virus).

References

1946 births
2006 deaths
Cameroonian dramatists and playwrights
Indiana University faculty
20th-century dramatists and playwrights